Kevin Allen may refer to:
Kevin Allen (author) (born 1954), American author and businessman
Kevin Allen (director) (born 1959), Welsh-born English actor
Kevin Allen (tackle) (born 1963), American football player
Kevin Allen (racing driver) (born 1965), American race car driver
Kevin Allen (guitarist), American guitar player with ...And You Will Know Us by the Trail of Dead
Kevin Allen (reality TV), American candidate on The Apprentice
Kevin Allen (defensive back) (born 1986), American football defensive back
Kevin Bond Allen (born 1954), bishop in the Anglican Church in North America
Kevin Allen (journalist), American sports journalist and author
Kevin Scott Allen (born 1957), American actor

See also
Allen (surname)